Prashanth Thiagarajan (born 6 April 1973), known professionally as Prashanth, is an Indian actor and businessman, known for his works predominantly in Tamil cinema. Besides Tamil films, he has also appeared in few Telugu, Hindi and Malayalam films. At the peak of his career in the late 1990s, Prashanth was one of the popular actors in South India. He has won  a Kalaimamani Award from the Government of Tamil Nadu.
The son of actor-director Thiagarajan, Prashanth began his career at 17 by appearing in Vaigasi Poranthachu (1990) and went on to feature in other films including Balu Mahendra's Vanna Vanna Pookkal (1992), R. K. Selvamani's Chembaruthi (1992), K. Rushendra Reddy's Tholi Muddhu (1993), and Mani Ratnam's action-comedy Thiruda Thiruda (1993). Prashanth rose to stardom with Shankar's romantic comedy Jeans (1998) in which he played a dual role alongside Aishwarya Rai. The success of this film saw him garner opportunities to work in bigger film projects and in the late 1990s, he featured in a series of breakthrough films such as Kannedhirey Thondrinal (1998), Kaadhal Kavithai (1998), Jodi (1999), Parthen Rasithen (2000) and Piriyadha Varam Vendum (2001).

Early life

Prashanth was born on 6 April 1973 in Chennai in the state of Tamil Nadu, India. He is the son of Thiagarajan (actor and director) in Tamil films while his maternal grandfather Peketi Sivaram was an actor and an acclaimed director of Telugu, Tamil and Kannada films. His maternal cousin is fellow film actor Vikram. His mother tongue is Tamil.

He studied Computer Graphics and Multimedia and went to Trinity College of Music in London before embarking on an acting career. He completed his 12th grade and was enlisted in two medical colleges. His first intention was to be a doctor, but finally he decided to be an actor, like his father T. Thiagarajan, also producer and film director.

Prashanth owns a multi-storeyed jewelry mart in Panagal Park. He is also a trained pianist.

Career

Early roles (1990–1997) 
Prashanth started off as a leading romantic hero in the 1990 film Vaigasi Poranthachu. He then appeared in the Malayalam film Perumthachan written by M. T. Vasudevan Nair where he played the son of the title character. He also acted in Tholi Muddhu alongside Divya Bharti which was the remake of the Bollywood film Dil.

Prashanth focused on Tamil and acted in Thiruda Thiruda (1993) directed by Mani Ratnam and music by A. R. Rahman. Prashanth used to be the chocolate boy of Tamil cinema during the 1990s and he plays a variation of that stereotype in portraying Azhagu. This is the most adventurous of Mani Ratnam's movies.  The film also won National Film Award for Best Special Effects. At the end of the year, he play in the film Kizhakke Varum Paattu (1993). In 1994, he released three films like Rasa Magan, Kanmani and Senthamizh Selvan. These films had an average success. Aanazhagan (1995), his only movie of the year was directed by Prashanth's father and actor Thiagarajan. In the film, Prashanth disguises himself as a woman in order convince the landlady. The film revolves around Prashanth and his friends who search for a new house after being kicked out from the previous place. Prashanth is forced to dress in the drag after the landlady insists that the house only for a family man and not bachelors. Aanazhagan was very successful at the box-office. The comedy tracks are still remembered today, and a stellar performance of Prashanth as Lakshmi. In 1996, he co-starred in Kalloori Vaasal with Ajith Kumar. The film opened on 18 February 1996 to mixed reviews. Krishna (1996) and  Mannava (1997) are also two medium success films.

Breakthrough and success (1998–1999) 
Prashanth appeared in dual roles in the 1998 film, Jeans under the direction of S. Shankar. It was quite the commercial enterprise. It featured Aishwarya Rai as the lead actress. The role of the male lead was declined by Abbas and Ajith Kumar, before it ended with the chocolate boy. The film was a modern-day Twelfth Night adaptation. The film has been nominated several awards in the country. The film opened to Indian audiences on 24 April 1998 and was the most expensive film to be made in Indian cinema at that time. Jeans has been shot all over the world. One particular song Poovukkul, says Shankar, has been filmed at the "seven wonders of the world", with Rai being referred to as "the eighth wonder of the world", with her beauty being no less than those wonders. It was later dubbed into Hindi and Telugu languages. He acted in two other romantic films that year, namely Kannedhirey Thondrinal and Kaadhal Kavithai. In 1999, he acted in romantic family dramas movies, Poomagal Oorvalam, Jodi, Hello and Aasaiyil Oru Kaditham.

At the peak of his career in the late 1990s, Prashanth appeared in stage events across the world for the Tamil diaspora titled "Prashanth Star Nite". Featuring him alongside actresses and comedians, the show was held in Singapore and then at Wembley Arena in London.

Career consolidation (2000–2005) 
In 2000, he acted films in Good Luck, Appu, and Parthen Rasithen. Parthen Rasithen was a commercial success. In 2001, he starred in Piriyadha Varam Vendum directed by Kamal which had a delayed release but was a success. He followed this with Star, Chocolate and Majunu.

Prashanth then collaborated with director Hari, making his debut, for the action drama film, Thamizh (2002). For this role, Prashanth worked out a lot, grew a beard and began smoking cigarettes to get into character. The film gained positive reviews upon release, with a critic noting the "Prashanth has matured into a performer of merit" and that "the transformation of a fun-loving, cheerful young man into a thug has been conceived well by director Hari and creditably executed by Prashanth".
The film became a box office success despite opening with little publicity, with positive word of mouth significantly helping the film's prospects. The success of the film prompted Prashanth to move away from romantic films and strive to work on more action drama films. His next release, Susi Ganesan's Virumbugiren had a delayed release in 2002, and won positive reviews from critics. For his role of a firefighter, Prashanth undertook official training, and reviewers described his portrayal as "top class". Sundar C's Winner (2003) also won appreciation for its comedy track by Vadivelu, and performed well at the box office.

In a sudden change of strategy, Prashanth chose to focus on acting in films produced by his father Thiagarajan for the family's production studio, Lakshmi Shanthi Movies. The action drama Jai (2004) did not perform well at the box office and received mixed reviews. A critic from Sify.com called Jai "tedious" and added that "on the whole Prashanth has to try out something new" Post-release, Prashanth noted that as a producer of the film, the team had tried hard but ran into problems to begin with, lamenting that the project had been delayed by a year before filming started and thus the script lost its freshness. The horror film Shock, a remake of a Hindi film, was a hit. Other films including the action drama Aayudham (2005) and comedy London (2005), similarly met with a tepid response at the box office.

The actor suffered a setback in the mid-2000s, when he went on signing spree only for several of his projects to become shelved after being launched. In September 2004, Thiagarajan launched Police, a remake of the Hindi film Khakee and the film received coverage from the media after producers had approached Amitabh Bachchan and Aishwarya Rai for key roles, however the film failed to progress.
Prashanth next signed on to appear in Susi Ganesan's village action story Sakkarai in October 2004 only for the film to be discontinued after a grand launch ceremony. In mid-2005, the actor began filming for A. Venkatesh's Petrol and after several leading actresses were approached to play the lead heroine, newcomer Seema was selected. The film continued to shoot schedules for close to a year across India, but Prashanth's marital problems eventually led to delays in the director's schedule and the film remains uncompleted.

In December 2005, Prashanth started work on R. K. Selvamani's Pulan Visaranai 2, a sequel to the director's 1990 film, with the film's soundtrack and trailer released by 2006. However, despite completion, the film was on hold for eight years due to producer's financial problems, before having a limited release in 2015. Furthermore, Ramesh Selvan's action film Runway was launched amidst much publicity in April 2006 but was discontinued despite the team filming a schedule with actress Ferhana.  Morgan's Taxi Driver alongside Reemma Sen and Namitha was also planned amidst much hype, with the team announcing schedules in the Middle East as well as marking the debut of music composer G. V. Prakash Kumar; though the film was later shelved. His father's production Kattan with director Suresh also never took off despite an official announcement. The actor's other projects during the period which were announced but never made included Raghuraj's Jockey, Mukil's Arun Weds Harini and Cheyyaru Ravi's Vithagan.

Professional setback (2006–2011) 
The actor's three films which released in 2006 had all been severely delayed during production and neither of the films made any notable impact at the box office. Jambhavan, which released in September 2006, had gone through production hassles notably after the lead heroine Nila had a spat with the producers and delayed the film's shoot. The film opened to negative reviews and became a failure commercially. Debutant director's Bhuvanaraja's Adaikalam, a family drama which had been completed the previous year, gained positive reviews but the low key nature of the release hampered any chance of a successful box-office run. Featuring no lead heroine, the film told the tale of an estranged family with Thiagarajan, Saranya and Uma also in the cast and a critic noted that "as a brother and a bitter son, Prashanth has churned out what is arguably one of his better performances till date." His final release of the year was Shiva Shanmugam's Thagapansamy which featured Prashanth in the role of a village do-gooder, with Pooja and Namitha in other pivotal characters. The film opened to below average collections and average reviews from critics, though Sify.com noted to "watch the film for the one-man-show of Prashanth, as he is the only silver lining in a film with a confused and confounded plot."

Prashanth had no film releases between January 2007 and April 2011, but was involved in the production of two heavily delayed films during the period – Ponnar Shankar and Mambattiyan. The actor also invested in business opportunities, opening a 12-floor jewellery store in T Nagar, Chennai in 2008. In early 2007, Thiagarajan approached Karunanidhi with the intention of making a film on his adaptation of the Ponnar Shankar epic that he had written in the late 1970s. The latter accepted Thiagarajan's offer and approved of his decision to cast Prashanth in the dual lead roles. The film's grand production and shoot continued for over three years, and the film had a theatrical release in April 2011. A reviewer from The Hindu noted the film an "alluring canvas", praising the opulent sets, locations, rich costumes and imposing cast, yet noted that it was "too short to negate the many loopholes". Though Prashanth's stunt acts were appreciated, the reviewer pointed out his character flaws, such as minimal expressions which were "barely a smirk" in the initial scenes, and the distinct lack of distinguishable traits between the twin characters he depicted. In September 2008, Thiagarajan announced that he would remake his successful 1983 film Malaiyoor Mambattiyan, with Prashanth portraying the lead role of a Robin Hood-esque figure. The team began filming in early 2009, and Prashanth grew his hair and put on weight for the project and the team shot in the forests of Tamil Nadu, Kerala and Karnataka. Prior to the film's release, Thiagarajan considered a possible sequel to the venture, stating he would decide after seeing the audience's response. The film opened to mixed reviews in December 2011, though Prashanth won positive reviews for his portrayal of the tribal man, with a critic from The Hindu noting the actor performed "perfectly" and as the "hero has slogged it out – it's only fair the industriousness is rewarded". The film took a good opening at the box office, but it however petered out to do average business commercially and due to its big budget, failed to recover costs.

Career decline (2012–present) 
Prashanth's latest films have been synonymous with remakes, expansive press releases and long production delays. He began making Saagasam, a remake of the Telugu film Julai (2012) during 2013, but the film had a delayed release in February 2016. Throughout the production, the film went through several changes in cast and crew and opened to mixed reviews, with a critic noting "Prashanth, making a return to the screen after quite a while, gives his best, but we can't help but feel that this required an even younger hero" and "what lets the film down the most is that it is directed without any feel for the material, so we are unsure if we need to take the film seriously or as a spoof". During 2014 and 2015, he worked on the proposed remake of the Hindi film Special 26 (2013), and despite several press announcements unveiling updates and proposed cast members, the film was later transferred to a different production team. In early 2017, Prashanth worked on the thriller film Johnny, a remake of the Hindi film Johnny Gaddaar (2007). The film went through changes in cast before being released in December 2018 to mixed reviews from critics and a below average opening at the box office. A comeback to Telugu films through a supporting role in Vinaya Vidheya Rama (2019) was also unsuccessful, with the film garnering negative reviews and having a poor performance commercially.

In March 2013, it was reported that the Tamil film Naan would be remade in Hindi with Prashanth in the lead role. Despite a production delay, Thiagarajan confirmed that the film would be made during an interview in December 2018. Moreover, in November 2013, Prashanth announced that he had registered the title Jeans 2 and was completing the pre-production works of a sequel to the 1998 film. The film was set to be directed and produced by Prashanth's father Thiagarajan, who revealed that production would begin in May 2014 and that they were trying to bring members of the original team back for the venture. In January 2014, Ashok Amritraj stated that he was not involved in the sequel and questioned the viability of the project, citing that he did not believe that Prashanth and his father had the rights to make a sequel. In February 2016, Prashanth reaffirmed that the sequel was in development. In April 2019, Prashanth began working on an action film with director A. Venaktesh, where he would feature alongside model Anukreethy Vas. Prashanth also began working on the remake of Andhadhun (2018) in August 2019.

Awards 
 Kalaimamani Award – Contribution to Tamil movie industry (1998)

Personal life 
On 1 September 2005, Prashanth married V. D. Grahalakshmi and their son was born on 31 July 2006. The couple divorced three years later.

Filmography
As actor

As singer

Notes

References

External links
 

Male actors in Hindi cinema
Tamil male actors
Living people
Male actors in Malayalam cinema
Filmfare Awards South winners
Male actors in Tamil cinema
Recipients of the Kalaimamani Award
20th-century Indian male actors
21st-century Indian male actors
Indian male film actors
1973 births
Male actors in Telugu cinema
Male actors from Chennai
Indian pianists